Bo'ao railway station is a railway station on the Hainan eastern ring high-speed railway, serving Bo'ao, Qionghai, Hainan.

Railway stations in Hainan